Tako (trans. That Way) was a Yugoslav progressive rock band formed in Belgrade in 1974. They were one of the most prominent acts of the Yugoslav progressive rock scene.

The band was formed by bass guitarist Dušan Ćućuz, keyboardist Đorđe Ilijin, guitarist and vocalist Sava Bojić and drummer Milan Lolić. In 1977 Bojić and Lolić were replaced by Miroslav Dukić and Slobodan Felekatović respectively. After the lineup change, the band gained large media attention and released their debut self-titled album in 1978. In 1980 the band released their second album, disbanding soon after.

History

1974-1981
Tako was formed in 1974 by Dušan "Dule" Ćućuz (bass guitar), Đorđe Ilijin (keyboards), Sava Bojić (guitar, vocals) and Milan "Mića Žorž" Lolić (drums). Ćućuz was previously a member of the bands Vihori (The Winds), Džentlmeni and Plamenih 6, he was one of the original Opus members and in the first half of the 1970s he worked as sound engineer for YU Grupa., Sava Bojić was one of the original Pop Mašina members, and Đorđe Ilijin previously worked as a music teacher and often appeared as a guest musician on other bands' album recordings playing keyboards, flute and harmonica. Initially, beside their own songs, the band performed Jimi Hendrix Experience and Santana covers. The band had their first live performance in the autumn of 1975, on a charity concert held in Belgrade's Pionir Hall, with funds raised dedicated to people suffering from muscular dystrophy. During 1975 they made their first demo recordings, the songs "Čujem svoje misli" ("I Hear My Thoughts"), "Daždevnjak" ("Salamander"), "Lena" and "Čudan grad" ("Strange Town"), in Radio Belgrade studios. They spent the summer of 1976 performing in International Student Center in Dubrovnik.

In 1977 Bojić had to leave the band due to his mandatory stint in the Yugoslav army, and Lolić was excluded from the band because of frequent alcohol abuse. They were replaced by guitarist and singer Miroslav Dukić, a former member of the band Koren (Root), and drummer Slobodan Felekatović. This lineup of the band managed to reach broad audience. During 1977 Tako played as an opening band on Bijelo Dugme tour, which brought them nationwide media attention, performing also on Bijelo Dugme's famous Hajdučka česma concert. In November 1977 Tako and progressive/acoustic rock band S Vremena Na Vreme organized a quadraphonic sound concert in Belgrade Youth Center. In 1978 Tako had a successful appearance at the BOOM Festival in Novi Sad.

After they were refused as non-commercial by several major record labels, the group, after their performance at the Subotica Youth Festival, got a contract offer from Ljubljana-based ZKP RTLJ. In 1978 the band released their debut self-titled for the label. The material on the album was recorded in only 36 hours. The album featured symphonic rock-oriented songs with jazz elements. The song "Lena" featured S Vremena Na Vreme member Asim Sarvan on vocals, and the song "Minijatura" ("Miniature") was composed as a tribute to the band Jethro Tull. The band promoted the album with a free concert held at Belgrade's Kalemegdan. At the beginning of 1979, after another quadraphonic sound concert organized with S Vremena Na Vreme, Tako went on hiatus because Ilijin got arthritis. Dukić used the hiatus to form his own band.

A year later, the band continued their activity. Their second album, U vreći za spavanje (In a Sleeping Bag), was released in September 1980 through Belgrade-based PGP-RTB. The album was produced by band members themselves, with every song on the album being produced by a member who wrote it. The band went on a promotional tour, however, due to the departure of Slobodan Felekatović, who had to leave the band because of his mandatory army stint, and due to the rising popularity of Yugoslav new wave bands, Tako decided to end their activity. They held their farewell concert at the University of Belgrade Faculty of Philosophy at the beginning of 1981.

Post breakup
After the disbandment, Dukić became a studio musician, while Ćućuz worked as a sound engineer for hard rock bands Riblja Čorba, Divlje Jagode and Kerber. Ilijin dedicated himself to music education and archaeology, but he also produced albums by several bands. In 1983, he released the solo album Zabranjeno prisluškivanje (Eavesdropping Forbidden) on which he sang and played all the instruments except drums (which were played by Vladimir "Furda" Furduj, a former Elipse and Korni Grupa member). He later moved to the United States, where he continued to work as a producer.

In 1993 German record label Kalemegdan Disk reissued both Tako albums on vinyl. Both albums featured new luxurious covers designed by Momčilo Rajin. Tako reissue featured "Put na jug" ("Journey to the South"), and U vreći za spavanje reissue featured "Izgubljeno ništa" ("Lost Nothing") and "Horde mira" ("Hordes of Peace") as bonus tracks. All of these tracks were recorded during the 1975—1981 period, but were previously unreleased. In 1994 the song "U vreći za spavanje" was released on Komuna compilation album Plima: Progresvna muzika (Tide: Progressive Music), which featured songs by former Yugoslav progressive rock acts. In 1998, Brazilian record label Rocksymphony reissued both Tako and U vreći za spavanje on compact disc.

In 2010 Miroslav Dukić, under the name D Mirro, rerecorded old Tako songs, releasing them on the album Tako Reloaded.

Legacy
In 2014, Serbian alternative rock band Bjesovi covered Tako song "Probudi se" ("Wake Up") on their cover album Svetla svetlosti (Lights of Light).

Band members
Dušan Ćućuz - bass guitar, vocals (1974—1981)
Đorđe Ilijin - keyboards, harmonica, flute, harp, vocals (1974—1981)
Sava Bojić - guitar, vocals (1974—1977)
Milan Lolić - drums (1974—1977)
Miroslav Dukić - guitar, vocals (1977—1981)
Slobodan Felekatović - drums (1977—1981)

Discography

Studio albums
Tako (1978)
U vreći za spavanje (1980)

References

External links
Tako at Discogs
Tako at Prog Archives

Serbian rock music groups
Serbian progressive rock groups
Serbian jazz-rock groups
Yugoslav rock music groups
Yugoslav progressive rock groups
Yugoslav jazz-rock groups
Musical groups from Belgrade
Musical groups established in 1975
Musical groups disestablished in 1981